Stanton, Wisconsin may refer to:
Stanton, Dunn County, Wisconsin, a town
Stanton, St. Croix County, Wisconsin, a town
Stanton (community), Wisconsin, an unincorporated community
Plover, Wisconsin, in Portage County, was previously known as Stanton